La Force is a commune in the Dordogne department in Nouvelle-Aquitaine in southwestern France.

Population

See also
 Communes of the Dordogne department
 Henri François Xavier de Belsunce de Castelmoron
 John Bost

References

Communes of Dordogne